The 2017 TCR International Series Oschersleben round was the seventh round of the 2017 TCR International Series season. It took place on 9 July at the Motorsport Arena Oschersleben.

Gianni Morbidelli won both races starting from pole position in Race 1 and tenth position in Race 2, driving a Volkswagen Golf GTI TCR.

Ballast
Due to the results obtained in the previous round, Attila Tassi received +30 kg, Norbert Michelisz +20 kg and Pepe Oriola +10 kg. Nevertheless, Michelisz didn't take part at this event, so he didn't take the ballast.

The Balance of Performance was also adjusted for this event, meaning the Alfa Romeo Giulietta TCRs, Audi RS3 LMS TCRs, Kia Cee'd TCRs, Subaru WRX STi TCRs, Peugeot 308 Racing Cup TCRs, Volkswagen Golf GTI TCRs and SEAT León TCRs was all given a -20 kg weight break, while the Honda Civic Type-R TCRs, Opel Astra TCRs and SEAT León TCR DSG's was given a -10 kg weight break. With the DSG equipped Audi RS3 LMS TCRs and SEAT León TCRs had their ride height reduced to 60mm.

Classification

Qualifying

Notes
 — Frédéric Vervisch was sent to the back of the grid for Race 1, after an engine change.

Race 1

Race 2

Standings after the event

Drivers' Championship standings

Model of the Year standings

Teams' Championship standings

 Note: Only the top five positions are included for both sets of drivers' standings.

References

External links
TCR International Series official website

Oschersleben
TCR International Series
TCR